DWTL (93.5 FM), broadcasting as Barangay FM 93.5, is a radio station owned and operated by GMA Network Inc. The station's studio and transmitter are located at the GMA Complex, Claveria Rd., Brgy. Malued, Dagupan.

History

1986–1992: The Giant 93.5 WDJ FM
The station was established on March 1, 1986, as The Giant 93.5 WDJ FM under the callsign DWDJ, with the slogan "Where The Music Is". It was the first regional FM station in Dagupan to carry an Adult Top 40 format using the English medium. However, it went off the air on April 29, 1992.

1992–2014: Campus Radio 93.5
On April 30, 1992, the station returned on-air as Campus Radio 93.5 and changed its callsign to DWTL, with the slogan "Forever", a year after the launching of RGMA done by Mike Enriquez. At the same time, it switched to Contemporary MOR format and later changed its medium to Filipino the following year.

2014–present: Barangay 93.5
On February 17, 2014, as part of RGMA's brand unification, the station rebranded as Barangay 93.5 and carried-over the slogan "Isang Bansa, Isang Barangay". Following the launch, it began simulcasting a handful of programs from its flagship station in Manila. In 2019, the station adapted its tagline "Ayos!", which was the tagline used by several Campus Radio stations.

References

External links

 

Radio stations in Dagupan
Barangay FM stations
Radio stations established in 1986

ceb:DWTL